ALSM may refer to:

ALSM1 protein, involved in Alström syndrome
Airborne laser swath mapping, an application of Lidar
ALSM, NASDAQ trading symbol for AlphaSmart
Average learning Subspace method, a form of Land cover mapping
A.L.Sm., taxonomic author abbreviation of Annie Lorrain Smith (1854–1937), British lichenologist